Sai Mai is one of the 50 districts (khet) of Bangkok, Thailand. It is bounded by (from north clockwise): Lam Luk Ka district of Pathum Thani province; Khlong Sam Wa, Bang Khen and Don Mueang of Bangkok. As of 2014, it had the highest population of all districts in Bangkok.

History
Sai Mai was the name of a muban (village) in tambon (sub-district) Khu Khot, Lam Luk Ka District, Pathum Thani Province. It was transferred to Bang Khen district and promoted to subdistrict (tambon) in 1940. Due to the growth of population in the area, Sai Mai was elevated to district status effective 21 November 1997 to improve service and administration.

The name of the village "Sai Mai" (lit: late or not) is believed to come from a story told in the past the area was very far from the downtown. Hence, passing by people often ask, "Will it be late to get here?". It is not related to Roti sai mai in any way.

The dominant feature of the district is Khlong (canal) Lat Phrao. The canal is thought to have been dug in the early period of the Rattanakosin Kingdom (1782–1932). Khlong Lat Phrao is one of nine canals in Bangkok that drains rainwater flowing into the city from northern Thailand, but it has been neglected for decades and clogged with refuse. In January 2016, 1.6 billion baht was allocated to rehabilitate the canal, widen it to 38 metres and deepen it to four metres. Construction is to be completed by June 2019.

Administration
The district is divided into three sub-districts (khwaeng).

Places
Bhumibol Adulyadej Hospital
Navaminda Kasatriyadhiraj Royal Thai Air Force Academy
Rittiyawannalai School
Saphan Mai

Transportation
There are three BTS Skytrain Sukhumvit line stations in Sai Mai: Bhumibol Adulyadej Hospital, Royal Thai Air Force Museum, and Yaek Kor Por Aor. All stations are on the Phahonyothin Road, the westside border to Don Mueang district.

References

External links
 BMA website with the tourist landmarks of Sai Mai
 Sai Mai district office (Thai only)

 
Districts of Bangkok